Who's Been Sleeping in My Brain is the debut studio album by English gothic rock band Alien Sex Fiend. It was released on 25 November 1983 by Anagram Records. It was produced by Martin "Youth" Glover.

Track listing

Reception 

Who's Been Sleeping in My Brain was generally well received. Trouser Press called it "a charming collection of psychopunk".

Personnel 
 Alien Sex Fiend

 Nik Fiend (Nicholas Wade) – vocals
 Mrs. Fiend (Christine Wade) – keyboards
 Yaxi Highrizer (David James) – guitar
 Johnnie Ha-Ha (Johnnie Freshwater) – drums

 Technical

 Youth – production
 John Lee – engineering
 Trigger – engineering

References

External links 

 

1983 debut albums
Albums produced by Youth (musician)
Alien Sex Fiend albums